Messier 74 (also known as NGC 628 and Phantom Galaxy) is a large spiral galaxy in the equatorial constellation Pisces. It is about 32 million light-years away from Earth. The galaxy contains two clearly defined spiral arms and is therefore used as an archetypal example of a grand design spiral galaxy.  The galaxy's low surface brightness makes it the most difficult Messier object for amateur astronomers to observe.  Its relatively large angular (that is, apparent) size and the galaxy's face-on orientation make it an ideal object for professional astronomers who want to study spiral arm structure and spiral density waves. It is estimated that M74 hosts about 100 billion stars.

Observation history
M74 was discovered by Pierre Méchain in 1780. He then communicated his discovery to Charles Messier, who listed the galaxy in his catalog.  In July 2022, it was observed by the James Webb Space Telescope, not long after it began taking its first pictures and observations and soon astronomy image processor Judy Schmidt made images of it available.

Structure
M74 has two spiral arms that wind counterclockwise from the galaxy's center. The spiral arms widen as they get farther from M74's center, but one of the arms narrows and the end. The arms deviate slightly from a constant angle.

Supernovae
Three supernovae are known to have taken place within it: SN 2002ap, SN 2003gd, and SN 2013ej (the numbers denote the year). The latter was bright as 10th magnitude when viewed from the surface of Earth, so visible from almost all modern telescopes in a good night sky.

SN 2002ap was one of few Type Ic supernovae (which denotes hypernovae) recorded within 10 Mpc every century.  This explosion has been used to test theories on the origins of others further away and theories on the emission by supernovae of gamma ray bursts.

SN 2003gd is a Type II-P supernova.  Type II supernovae have known luminosities, so they can be used to accurately measure distances.  The distance measured to M74 using SN 2003gd is 9.6 ± 2.8 Mpc, or 31 ± 9 million ly.  For comparison, distances measured using the brightest supergiants are 7.7 ± 1.7 Mpc and 9.6 ± 2.2 Mpc.  Ben Sugerman found a "light echo" – a later reflection of the explosion – associated with SN 2003gd.  This is one of the few supernovae in which such a reflection has been found.  This reflection appears to be from dust in a sheet-like cloud that lies in front of the supernova, and it can be used to determine the composition of the interstellar dust.

Galaxy group
This is the brightest member of the M74 Group, a group of 5 to 7 galaxies that also includes the peculiar spiral galaxy NGC 660 and a few irregular galaxies.  Different group membership identification methods (ranging from a clear, to likely, to perhaps historic gravitational tie) identify several objects of the group in common, and a few galaxies whose exact status within such groupings is currently uncertain.

Suspected black hole
In 2005 the Chandra X-ray Observatory announced its observation of an ultraluminous X-ray source (ULX) in M74, radiating more X-ray power than a neutron star, in periodic intervals of around two hours. This is an indicator of an intermediate-mass black hole. This would be a rather uncommon class, in between in size of stellar black holes and the massive black holes theorized to be in the center of many galaxies. Such an object is believed to form from lesser ("stellar") black holes within a star cluster. The source has been given identification number CXOU J013651.1+154547.

Amateur astronomy observation
Messier 74 is 1.5° east-northeast of Eta Piscium.  This galaxy has the second-lowest Earth-surface brightness of any Messier object.  (M101 has the lowest.)  It requires a good night sky.   This galaxy may be best viewed under low magnification; when highly magnified, the diffuse emission becomes more extended and appears too faint to be seen by many people.  Additionally, M74 may be more easily seen when using averted vision when the eyes are fully dark adapted.

See also
 List of Messier objects

 NGC 3184 – a similar face-on spiral galaxy
 Messier 101 – a similar face-on spiral galaxy
 Whirlpool Galaxy – a well-known face-on spiral galaxy

References and footnotes

External links
 
 Spiral Galaxy M74 @ SEDS Messier pages
 

Unbarred spiral galaxies
Messier 074
Messier 074
074
Messier 074
01149
05974
Astronomical objects discovered in 1780